Until 2010, there was a controversy between two dominant parties of Bangladesh, Awami League (AL) and Bangladesh Nationalist Party (BNP), over who had issued the proclamation of Bangladeshi Independence: AL claimed Bangabandhu Sheikh Mujibur Rahman and BNP claimed Ziaur Rahman. However, Bangabandhu is described as the proclaimer of the independence of Bangladesh in all diplomatic secret documents of the Richard Nixon administration. In 2010, a ruling of the Supreme Court officially recognized Bangabandhu as the promulgator, and denounced the views of BNP, calling it distortion of history.

History
Since the establishment, Bengali-majority of Pakistan wanted a full autonomous and cultural status, which resulted a rise of nationalist and pro-democratic movements in the country. Awami League, established in 1949, became the leading and representative party of the Bengalis in Pakistan. In 1970 Pakistani general election, the League won absolute victory and emerged as the largest political party in the country, but junta government of Yahya Khan refused to transfer power for its pro-Bengali and secular stance. On 1 March, 1971, Bangabandhu Sheikh Mujibur Rahman, then president of Awami League, declared civil disobedience movement in East Pakistan. On 7 March, 1971, Bangabandhu delivered his historic speech, concluded with, "The struggle this time, is a struggle for our liberty. The struggle this time, is a struggle for our independence. Joy Bangla!" It's widely considered as the de facto declaration of Bangladeshi independence.

On 25 March, 1971, Pakistani forces conducted Operation Searchlight in the city of Dacca and killed thousands of unarmed people at midnight. Bangabandhu was arrested that night, nearly at 1.30 am of 26 March, and was secretly taken away to West Pakistan. Before his arrest, Bangabandhu officially declared the independence at 12.20 am on March 26 from his house at Dhanmondi: Another declaration reportedly to be sent that time:

Mujib's telegram was widely reported on radio on 26 March 1971. M. A. Hannan, secretary of the Awami League in Chittagong, read out the statement in Bengali at 2.30 pm and 7.40 pm from a radio station in Chittagong. The text of the Hannan's broadcast stated the following:

On 27 March, 1971, Major Ziaur Rahman broadcast Mujib's message. Zia's message stated the following:

On 10 April, 1971, the constituent assembly of the Provisional Government of Bangladesh ratified Bangabandhu's proclamation of independence:

United States documents

According to South Asian crisis, 1971, a secret document published by the United States Department of State covering the Indo-Pakistan affairs that time, United States was observing the situations of Pakistan from March 1971. On 26 March, 1971, just after the Operation Searchlight, US president Richard Nixon called an emergency meeting with then US Secretary of State Henry Kissinger, the Special Action Group Washington, the National Security Committee, and the CIA representatives at the White House, where it was said to have declared the independence of East Pakistan. Richard Helms, Director of the CIA, said on that meeting:

Controversy
Bangladesh Nationalist Party strongly claimed Ziaur Rahman as the proclaimer of independence. Even some of the BNP leaders openly denounced Bangabandhu as the false proclamer during Khaleda Zia’s premiership.

The controversy, lasted nearly two decades, led the country to a political and an ideological crisis. When a different party comes to power, they change the history books of Bangladesh to either prefer Sheikh Mujibur Rahman or Ziaur Rahman.

However, some minor controversies also involve around the broadcasting of the proclamation. According to A. K. Khandker Bir Uttom, a military officer during the liberation war and former planning minister of Bangladesh, on 26 March, a technician at Swadhin Bangla Betar Kendra read out the proclamation of independence first over the radio. According to Abdullah Abu Sayeed, Ekushey Padak Medalist Swadhin Bangla Betar Kendra artist Abul Kashem Sandwip also read the proclamation before Ziaur Rahman.

Controversial quote of A. K. Khandker
In 2014, A. K. Khandker claimed in his book  (lit: "1971: Inside Out") that Bangabandhu did not make any proclamation about independence from March 7 until his arrest, nor did he leave any written notes or recorded voice messages and did not follow any predetermined directions. Additionally, he also controversially quoted that Bangabandhu cried Joy Pakistan ("Victory to Pakistan") alongside Joy Bangla in his speech on 7 March, 1971. But after its publication, there was widespread criticism among the contemporary Awami League leaders and in the parliament session, and a case was filed against the author and the book for distortion of historical informations, and the author withdrew the said part of the book and other related parts. Later he formally announced an apology for giving false informations in his book.

Supreme Court ruling
In 2010, the third volume of Bangladesh Independence War: Documents, published presenting Ziaur Rahman as the proclaimer, was declared null and void by the Supreme Court, and the volume was ordered to be confiscated and withdrawn from all places in the country and abroad. Directions given by the High Court Division:

References

1990s in Bangladesh
2000s in Bangladesh
Aftermath of the Bangladesh Liberation War
History of Bangladesh (1971–present)
Political history of Bangladesh